Buckler's Mead Academy is a secondary school and specialist Technology College in Yeovil, Somerset, England. As of 2014, it has 907 students between the ages of 11 and 16. The school offers a range of subjects including art, beliefs and values, citizenship, drama, geography, history, mathematics, modern foreign languages, music, physical education and technology. In August 2011, the school became an academy.

Year groups 
The school is split like most other secondary schools in England into five-year groups ranging from 7 through to 11. Each year group contains approximately 200 students, separated into six groups of around 30 students called tutor groups. Each tutor group has a form tutor. Tutor groups meet once a day for registration, in the morning at the very beginning of the school day, 8:30. Every year group is led by a year coordinator.

Ofsted inspection judgements

As of 2021, the school's most recent inspection by Ofsted was in 2019, with a judgement of Inadequate.

References

External links 
 

Academies in Somerset
Buildings and structures in Yeovil
Secondary schools in Somerset